SS Auguste Helmerich was a German cargo ship that collided with  off Dalarö (east coast of Öland) while on a voyage from Kotka, Finland to Hamburg, Germany with a cargo of wood.

Construction 
Auguste Helmerich was constructed in 1889 at the Koch Henry A.G. shipyard in Lübeck, Germany. She was completed in 1889.

Sinking 
The ship foundered with no casualties.

Wreck 

References

Cargo ships of Germany
Ships sunk in collisions
Steamships of the German Empire
Shipwrecks in the Baltic Sea
1889 ships
Ships sunk with no fatalities
Ships built in Lübeck
Maritime incidents in 1919